The  Cabinet of Ministers is an executive body presided by the Chairman of the Cabinet of Ministers of Kyrgyzstan. The status and provisions of the government are determined by Section V of the Constitution of Kyrgyzstan. The cabinet consists of the deputy chairmen, ministers and the chairmen of state committees.

Current Cabinet of Ministers

Below are the 16 members of the Cabinet of Ministers as of 3 February 2021: 

The Kyrgyzstan Parliament approved a smaller executive cabinet, consolidating several ministries and reducing their number from 22 to 16 on 3 February 2021; this was partially in response to the political unrest which swept the nation in October 2020. President Sadyr Japarov has stated he would like to see further reductions.

Chairman of the Cabinet of Ministers – Ulukbek Maripov.
First Deputy Chairman – Artyom Novikov
Deputy Chairman — Ulukbek Karymshakov
Minister of Economy and Finance – Ulukbek Karymshakov
Minister of Defense – Taalaibek Omuraliev
Minister of Foreign Affairs – Ruslan Kazakbayev 
Minister of Justice – Asel Chinbayeva
Minister of Internal Affairs – Ulan Niyazbekov
Minister of Education and Science – Almazbek Beyshenaliev
Minister of Health and Social Development – Alymkadyr Beyshenaliev
Minister of Transportation, Architecture, Construction and Communication – Gulmira Abdralieva
Minister of Energy and Industry – Kubanychbek Turdubayev
Minister of Agriculture, Water Resources and Regional Development – Askarbek Janybekov
Minister of Emergency Situations – Boobek Ajikeev
Minister of Culture, Information, Sports and Youth Policy – Kayrat Iymanaliev
Chairman of the State Committee for National Security – Kamchybek Tashiev

 Head of the Government Office — Jenishbek Asankulov, Minister of Economy and Finance.

References

External links